"I Just Wanna Party" is the second single of American  rapper Yelawolf's album Trunk Muzik 0-60. The track features fellow Southern rapper Gucci Mane and production from WillPower, it was written by Michael Wayne Atha, Radric Davis, Kawan Prather and William Washington. The song was released as a single on August 12, 2010. The song debuted, and peaked at number 109 on the Hot R&B/Hip-Hop Songs becoming Yelawolf's highest-charting song at that time.

Track listing
Digital download
 "I Just Wanna Party" (featuring Gucci Mane) – 5:11

Music video 
The music video was filmed in Gadsden, Alabama and directed by Motion Family. It features cameo appearances by fellow rappers Shawty Fatt, Rittz, Big Boi and Jackie Chain. The video shows both Yelawolf and Gucci Mane in a house at a party, scenes of Yelawolf in the house front drinking while everyone are unconscious drunk, it ends with a drunk Yelawolf grabbing a keg of beer and returning to the house.

Credits and personnel
Songwriter –  Michael Wayne Atha, William Washington, Radric Davis, Kawan Prather
Production – WillPower

Charts

References

2010 singles
Gucci Mane songs
Yelawolf songs
2010 songs
Songs written by Kawan Prather
Songs written by Gucci Mane
Interscope Records singles
Songs written by Yelawolf